The Civil Service Development Institute (CSDI) is the agency of the Directorate-General of Personnel Administration of the Executive Yuan of the Taiwan (ROC) responsible to provide continuing learning for civil servants in Taiwan.

History
CSDI was originally established in 1968 as Training Center for Government Officials. On 19 April 2017, the Organization Act of Civil Service Development Institute was promulgated. On 31 March 2017, it was passed in the Legislative Yuan and it went into enforcement on 7 July 2017. On 19 June 2017, the Executive Yuan approved the Civil Service Development Institute and it was formally established on 7 July 2017.

Organizational structure
 Educational Affairs Division
 Counseling Division
 Research Division
 Secretariat
 Personnel Office
 Accounting Office

See also
Directorate-General of Personnel Administration

References

External links
 

1968 establishments in Taiwan
Executive Yuan
Government agencies established in 1968
Government of Taiwan